Carter Hayden (born February 12, 1982) is a Canadian voice, film and television actor. He is most well-known for his role as Noah in the animated franchise Total Drama.

Early life
Hayden was born in British Columbia on February 12, 1982.

Career
He voiced Noah in the first season, Total Drama Island, and the third season, Total Drama World Tour. He also had a brief cameo appearance in the second season, Total Drama Action, and later reprised the role in both Skatoony, as well as the official spin-off series Total Drama Presents: The Ridonculous Race. 

Noah has since become one of the most popular Total Drama characters, and for his performance in the third season (for which he had to sing on several occasions), Hayden was nominated for "Best Voice Actor in a TV Series" in the 2011 ToonZone Awards.

Filmography

Movies

Film

Television

Video games

References

External links
 
 

1982 births
Living people
Canadian male film actors
Canadian male television actors
Canadian male voice actors
Male actors from Vancouver